Melissa Bert serves as the Judge Advocate General and Chief Counsel of the United States Coast Guard. Rear Admiral (Upper Half) (RADM) Bert is the first woman to serve in this position. Prior flag assignments held by RADM Bert include the U.S. Coast Guard’s Director of Governmental and Public Affairs and Deputy Director of Operations for U.S. Northern Command.

RADM Bert founded and launched the U.S. Coast Guard Women’s Leadership Initiative, supporting mentoring and professional development for Coast Guard women in uniform and civilians throughout the service.

Personal life
RADM Bert was born in New York, NY.  Her father, Ellis Bert, was a career Civil Rights Attorney, and her mother Allyne Bert (née Sackley), an elementary school teacher. Her sister, Alison Bert, trained as a classical guitarist, and later worked as a journalist and photographer. RADM Bert and her husband, met in Miami, FL and they have one child.

Education
RADM Bert earned a Juris Doctor from George Washington Law School and her Bachelor of Science degree from the U.S. Coast Guard Academy. She attended the Harvard Kennedy School as a National Security Fellow, where she focused on Arctic development and the Law of the Sea. RADM Bert later spent a year at the Council on Foreign Relations link as a senior military fellow. In both institutions, she provided thoughtful analysis of national security issues in the maritime sector, publishing in the New York Times, the Miami Herald, the Boston Globe, and academic journals.

Career
Following her graduation from the U.S. Coast Guard Academy, RADM Bert served aboard two Coast Guard cutters, including as Executive Officer of the Cutter Red Birch in Baltimore, MD. During the attacks of 9/11, RADM Bert was the Operations Officer for Coast Guard Sector Los Angeles/Long Beach, protecting one of the nation's most valuable ports.

In her legal career, she has served as a prosecutor, a Military Judge, Ethics Advisor, and as the Deputy Staff Judge Advocate for the Seventh District in Miami, Florida.

RADM Bert was the Speechwriter and Special Assistant to then Commandant of the Coast Guard, Admiral Thad Allen. In that role, she marketed the Coast Guard through strategic engagement opportunities and the drafting of persuasive policy speeches for national and international audiences.

RADM Bert was also privileged to Command Sector Juneau and direct mission execution in the unique environment of Southeastern Alaska. This command was geographically positioned to cover a 500-mile, environmentally-sensitive, panhandle of Southeastern Alaska and home to the fishing, cruise ship, and maritime tourism industries of the region.

She later headed the Coast Guard's Maritime and International Law Office providing legal advice on a variety of policies—including the Law of the Sea, drug and migrant interdiction, homeland security, search and rescue, pollution response, port and vessel safety/security, piracy, counter-terrorism, Arctic policy, environmental protection, and intelligence collection.

RADM Bert further served as the Chief of Staff for the Seventh Coast Guard District, the Coast Guard's largest regional command. There she was responsible for oversight of Coast Guard budget, people, and operations in the Southeastern United States, Puerto Rico, the Virgin Islands, and the Bahamas.

Following her promotion to flag-rank in 2016, RADM Bert served as the Deputy Director of Operations for the U.S. Northern Command, overseeing homeland defense and defense support for civil authorities for North America, as well as theater security cooperation with Mexico and The Bahamas. RADM Bert led the Northern Command's Future Operations Center in response to the devastating 2017 hurricane season of Hurricanes Harvey, Irma, and Maria.

RADM Bert also served as the Director of Governmental and Public Affairs at Coast Guard Headquarters in Washington, D.C., where she synchronized the service's external engagement with Congress, the media, and strategic partners and stakeholders. In this role, she provided strategic, executive-level advisement for a high-profile communications outreach and public relations program for the Coast Guard.

In April 2020, RADM Bert assumed the role of Judge Advocate General and Chief Counsel of the Coast Guard. She leads over 500 attorneys and legal professionals providing counsel on all Coast Guard missions and people, as well as Congressional, Inter-Agency and Maritime Industry engagement.

Other professional endeavors
RADM Bert has taught as an adjunct professor at George Washington University, Florida International University, and the University of Miami School of Law.

She is a life member of the Council on Foreign Relations and a Proctor in Admiralty in the U.S. Maritime Law Association. Additionally, RADM Bert was awarded Young Military Lawyer of the Year for the Coast Guard by the American Bar Association in 1997. In May 2006, she received the Judge Advocates Association Outstanding Career Armed Services Attorney Award. RADM Bert is a member of the Florida Bar Association and the District of Columbia Bar Association.

RADM Bert stays involved with the leadership and cadets at the U.S. Coast Guard Academy. She previously served as Vice Chair of the Coast Guard Academy Alumni Association Board of Directors. In her Washington, DC community, she currently provides pro bono legal services to the District of Columbia Superior Court Family Law Clinic.

Publications
RADM Bert has published the following articles:

See also
 List of female United States military generals and flag officers
 Women in the United States Coast Guard

References

External links
 U.S. Coast Guard Women's Leadership Initiative
 Coast Guard Office of the Judge Advocate General
 Join CGJAG

Living people
Female admirals of the United States Coast Guard
Judge Advocates General of the United States Coast Guard
United States Coast Guard Academy alumni
George Washington University Law School alumni
Recipients of the Legion of Merit
Recipients of the Meritorious Service Medal (United States)
Year of birth missing (living people)